Del Webb's Sun City Hilton Head (often shortened to Sun City Hilton Head or Sun City locally) is an age-restricted planned community located in the Okatie area of Beaufort and Jasper counties in the Lowcountry region of South Carolina. Although not a separate incorporated community or census-designated place, there are close to 10,000 permanent residents within three major phases of the community, which is clustered around its golf courses and community centers. The community is also renowned for its political activism, with many local, state, and national candidates for political office stopping in Sun City while in the area. Sun City is included within the Hilton Head Island-Bluffton-Beaufort, SC Metropolitan Statistical Area.

Geography
Sun City Hilton Head is located approximately 12 miles (20 km) west of Hilton Head Island itself and 20 miles (30 km) north of Savannah, Georgia, with close access to Interstate 95. Sun City is positioned across nearly 10,000 acres between the borders of Beaufort and Jasper counties along the major thoroughfares in the area, U.S. Highway 278 and S.C. Highway 170. The majority of the development is in unincorporated Beaufort County, while the Jasper County portions (sometimes referred to as Sun City North) are incorporated into Hardeeville. Addresses in Sun City have either an Okatie or a Bluffton ZIP code, but no portions of the development are within the Bluffton town limits.

Residents in Jasper County (which is called "the north side" by residents) pay higher taxes than those in Beaufort County (called "the south side" by residents). All the homes in the South side have been built out while as of July 2019 new homes are still being built in Jasper county. The builder has recently purchased additional land and 400 new homes are planned, but no more pools, gyms, or club houses are planned as of July 2019.

History
Using a similar design template from existing Del E. Webb Construction Company developments, Del E. Webb Construction Company purchased vast real estate holdings from the former Argent Lumber Company in the 1990s and began development of the Beaufort County portions. The majority of the property phases were folded into the "Sun City" development brand, while a phase of development located east of SC 170 was branded as "Riverbend" and featured higher-end homesites near the Okatie River. Nearly all of the Beaufort County portions of Sun City have been built out.

Del E. Webb Construction Company was acquired by PulteGroup in 2001 and began development of the Jasper County portions that same decade. Hardeeville annexed all of the Jasper County portions of the community in 2007, prior to construction. A new golf course, Argent Lakes, and amenity center opened in the Hardeeville area of Sun City in 2014.

There will be approximately 10,500 homes when the community is completed.

Neighborhood profile and governance
Sun City is a gated community and is age restricted to adults 55 and over. The majority of the residents are married and retired, though some continue to work full-time or part-time or have home-based businesses. Most of the single-family residential homes look out over golf course holes, ponds, or natural areas. Many residents travel in the community with golf carts or bicycles. A bridge connects the Beaufort and Jasper county portions of the community over US 278, thus avoiding the need to enter and exit through multiple gates and cross the heavily traveled highway.

Sun City contracts with a security provider that patrols the neighborhood and some of the gate entrances. Fire services are shared between the Bluffton Township and the Hardeeville fire departments.

Sun City has an internal property owners association (the Community Association) that manages the day-to-day operations of the community. The Board of Directors sets the policies. The five-member Board is composed of two residents, who are elected, and three representatives from the developer. Once the developer finishes building the board will be turned over to the residents.

Efforts to incorporate Sun City as an individual municipality have been attempted before, but South Carolina laws on incorporation have made it a challenging process. Hardeeville and Beaufort Country retain certain regulatory and policing authority over the community, but yield to the Community Association and its bylaws on specific matters.

Amenities
 Three golf courses (two full-length, one executive): Argent Lakes, Hidden Cypress and Okatie Creek
 20 acre lake (Lake Somerset)
 Tennis, Pickleball, Volleyball and Bocce courts
 Indoor Table Tennis courts
 Softball field
 Croquet field
 Community Garden 
 Three clubhouses with fitness centers. 
 Six pools (two indoor, four outdoor)
 540 seat Performing arts center (Magnolia Hall)
 Glossy award-winning monthly magazine which includes ongoing activities, club activities, and advertisements (SunSations)
 Large woodshop with an abundant assortment of power as well as hand tools (must be certified to use)
 Craft Center which houses the ceramics club, the art club, the photography club, the computer club, and the sewing club among others
 More than 100 clubs and groups
 Three restaurants 
 Full website: www.SunCityHiltonHead.org

References

Geography of Beaufort County, South Carolina
Geography of Jasper County, South Carolina
Hilton Head Island–Beaufort micropolitan area